Bruce Maccabee (born May 6, 1942) is an American optical physicist formerly employed by the U.S. Navy, and a  ufologist.

Biography 
Maccabee received a B.S. in physics at Worcester Polytechnic Institute in Worcester, Mass., and then at American University, Washington, DC, (M.S. and Ph.D. in physics).  In 1972 he began his career at the Naval Ordnance Laboratory, White Oak, Silver Spring, Maryland; which later became the Naval Surface Warfare Center Dahlgren Division.  Maccabee retired from government service in 2008.  He has worked on optical data processing, generation of underwater sound with lasers and various aspects of the Strategic Defense Initiative (SDI) and Ballistic Missile Defense (BMD) using high power lasers.

Ufology 
Maccabee has been interested in UFOs since the late 1960s when he joined the National Investigations Committee on Aerial Phenomena (NICAP) and was active in research and investigation for NICAP until its demise in 1980. He became a member of the Mutual UFO Network (MUFON) in 1975 and was subsequently appointed to the position of state Director for Maryland, a position he still holds. In 1979 he was instrumental in establishing the Fund for UFO Research (FUFOR) and was the chairman for about 13 years. He presently serves on the National Board of the Fund.

His UFO research and investigations (which, he often stresses, are completely unrelated to his Navy work) have included the Kenneth Arnold sighting (June 24, 1947), the McMinnville, Oregon (Trent) photos of 1950, the Gemini 11 astronaut photos of September, 1966, the Tehran UFO incident of September 1976, the New Zealand sightings of December 1978, the Japan Airlines (JAL1628) sighting of November 1986, the numerous sightings of Gulf Breeze UFO incident, 1987–1988, the "red bubba" sightings, 1990-1992 (including his own sighting in September, 1991), the Mexico City video of August, 1997 (which he deemed a hoax), the Phoenix lights sightings of March 13, 1997, 2004 Mexican UFO incident and many others.

He has also done historical research and was the first to obtain the secret "flying disc file" of the FBI (what he calls "the REAL X-Files"). In addition, he has collected documents from the CIA, the U.S. Air Force, the U.S. Army, and other government agencies.

Maccabee is the author or coauthor of about three dozen technical articles and more than a hundred trade articles about UFOs over the last 30 years, including many which appeared in the MUFON UFO Journal and MUFON Symposium proceedings. Among his papers was a reanalysis of the statistics and results of the famed Battelle Memorial Institute Project Blue Book Special Report No. 14, a massive analysis of 3200 Air Force cases through the mid-1950s. (See Identified Flying Objects (IFOs)).  Another was a reanalysis of the results of the Condon Committee UFO study from 1969. (Like many others, Maccabee concluded that Edward Condon lied about the results.)

In addition, he has also written or contributed to half a dozen books on the subject of UFOs and appeared on numerous radio and TV shows and documentaries (some given below) as an authority on the subject.

Maccabee is also a pianist who performed at the 1997 and 1999 MUFON symposia. He lives in Allen County, Ohio and married to Jan Maccabee.

References

External links 

 Bruce Maccabee - Homepage
 Bruce Maccabee - Homepage - Biography

1942 births
Living people
21st-century American physicists
American UFO writers
Ufologists
American University alumni
Search for extraterrestrial intelligence